Glass Creek is a waterway flowing through the inner-eastern suburbs of Melbourne. It is a minor tributary of the Yarra River and now largely runs through a series of underground drains.

Etymology 
The creek was named after Hugh Glass, a land speculator in the early history of Melbourne, in 1844. It was originally referred to as Glass' Creek but the spelling gradually fell out of use in favour of the present-day Glass Creek.

Life 
Glass Creek is known to have little other than plant-life as it is polluted. Within that, though there are some fish and crayfish including the western mosquitofish  and the Cherax (freshwater yabby).

Geography

Settlements 
The creek passes through two eastern suburbs of Melbourne in the City of Boroondara:
Kew East
Balwyn North

Parklands 
Much of the former creek route is now open parkland:

Jacka Street Reserve
Gordon Barnard Reserve
Hislop Park
Macleay/Myrtle Park
Stradbroke Park
Hays Paddock
Kew Billabong Reserve

History 
In the early history of Melbourne and during the indigenous settlement of the area, Glass Creek ran at-surface through what was then bushland. William Oswin is the first recorded owner of the land where Hays Paddock and Glass Creek flows into the Yarra on a property known as Kilby Farm. The first proposal to route the creek underground in its northern section was put forward by the City of Kew town clerk, W.D.Birrell, in 1943, but the project was not pursued. The exact date of the rest of the creek's re-routing through the underground drainage system is unknown, but a Melbourne and Metropolitan Board of Works map from the 1960s shows the creek entering the present-day drain near the southern entrance of Hays Paddock.

Route 

The original route of the creek originated near Loma Linda Grove in Greythorn, the eastern part of Balwyn North. It flowed through present-day Jacka Street and Gordon Barnard Reserves, crossed Balwyn Road, through Hislop and Macleay/Myrtle Park, through the residential areas roughly following Maylands Avenue, through Stradbroke Park near present-day Kew High School, under High Street and along the present-day Glass Creek Trail before joining up to the current course near the southern entrance to Hays Paddock. Thence it flowed north-west into the Yarra River.

References

See also 
Koonung Creek
Merri Creek

Melbourne Water catchment
Rivers of Greater Melbourne (region)
Tributaries of the Yarra River